George Jones & The Smoky Mountain Boys is a studio album by American country music artists George Jones and The Smoky Mountain Boys, who served as Roy Acuff's long-time backing band.

Background
The album was recorded in one session in the early 1970s but had remained unreleased.  In the liner notes writer Bill Bentley states, "Finding these tapes now is like discovering a long-lost script that offers secrets from a long gone world. The dozen selections are a peek into a precious freedom, and what a true pioneer can do when the music calls out to them. George Jones recorded more albums than just about any other country singer, but he never made one like this. This is the sound of music played by people who lived their lives serving the true spirit, and sung by a man who walked this world only once."  The album is composed of country classics and Gospel standards, several of them composed by Acuff, who was a profound musical influence on Jones.  As Jones biographer Rich Kienzle observes, Acuff and his Smoky Mountain Boys "had an unforgettable dynamic: his fiddling and rough-edged, deeply emotional vocals were accompanied by a raw, traditional string ensemble.”  In a 2006 interview with Ray Waddell of Billboard, Jones stated, "I loved Roy Acuff with all my heart, and I never dreamed I'd be able to meet him or see him onstage, or especially become good friends with him."  Acuff duets with Jones on his signature song “Wabash Cannonball.”

Track listing

Personnel
 Design: Jimmy Hole
 Executive Producer: Gary Paczosa
 Liner notes: Bill Bentley
 Mastering: Paul Blakemore 
 Mixing: Shani Gandhi

References

2017 albums
George Jones albums